Makayla Oghenefejiro Oluwayimika Malaka, (born 27 June 2012) popularly known as Makayla Malaka, is a British-Nigerian singer and dancer. She began her musical career as a child singer, releasing her debut album age eight.

Background 

Makayla is from Isoko North in Delta state. She was born in Camden, London, United Kingdom. She resides in Lagos, Nigeria with her parents. She is the only child of her parents.

Career 

Makayla started her career at six years old, recording her first songs. In 2020, she released her debut album titled Eight, at age eight. Followed by two more albums, released the next year and the year after that; titled Nine and Ten respectively. The song on her first album titled Grandma Told Me was remixed by Speroach, while her third album had features with commediene Emmanuella Samuel and saxophonist Temilayo Abodunrin on the track titled Yes O.

In 2022, she authored the book titled African Princess, which told the story of the experience and value a young girl growing in a male-dominated Nigerian society. The book was an adaptation of one of the tracks from her Sophomore album with the same name. It was co-authored by Sope Martins and was made available to schools. The book was released on 27 May, 2022.

In an interview with The Punch, she cites her role model as Michael Jackson. Mr Eazi acknowledged her work in a tweet, after the release of her debut album.

Her genre of music are children's music and afro pop, which she terms as child friendly. Makayla believes that every child has a gift etched in them. She is of the opinion that children should only be exposed to clean music.

Makayla was tipped by Pulse Nigeria and the Nigerian Tribune as an artiste to look out for in the future, in 2020 and 2022 respectively.

Discography

Awards 
She was one of the recipients of the 2022 Eko Heritage Awards where she won the Eko Celebrity Kid of the Year. The awards show held on 10 July 2022. She also performed live at the awards show.

References

External links
 

Nigerian women pop singers
Living people
Nigerian rhythm and blues singers
English-language singers from Nigeria
21st-century Nigerian women singers
Nigerian women singer-songwriters
2012 births
Musicians from Lagos State
Musicians from Delta State
People from Delta State